Srnetica is a village in the municipality of Istočni Drvar (East Drvar), Bosnia and Herzegovina. It lies in western Bosnia, in the part of municipality of Drvar awarded to Republika Srpska, at a mountain saddle about 1050 metres above sea. 

From the beginning of 20th century to 1975, there was a main junction of forest narrow-gauge railways built by AG Otto Steinbeis. The tracks are now dismantled and transformed into paths.

Demographics 
According to the 2013 census, its population was nil.

References

Populated places in Istočni Drvar